Members of the U.S. Army Special Forces will emphatically assert that the "Green Beret" is a hat and not the man who wears it. Nevertheless, for a time in the 1960s the Green Berets and the men who wore them became a national fad emerging in a wide variety of popular culture referents. After a decline in popularity during the 1970s — coinciding with the American public's backlash against the Vietnam War — the Green Berets gripped the popular imagination again beginning with the Rambo film franchise in 1982. They continue to appear as both major and minor referents in popular culture — especially in movies and television — often serving as a shorthand signifier for a shady or covert military background for a fictional character. As a dramatic device, this can cut both ways — i.e., lead an audience to either admire or fear (or both) a character.

Soldiers of the "New Frontier"
Although the U.S. Army Special Forces were created with a low profile in 1952, and the green beret was not officially authorized, things changed dramatically with President John F. Kennedy. He wanted to challenge Communist influence and wars of liberation in the recently decolonized Third World, and bolster pro-American regimes with the U.S. Army's own special forces and counter-guerrilla fighters.

On 12 October 1961, Kennedy visited the U.S. Special Warfare Center, where his aide, Major General Chester V. Clifton (and friend of the SWC Commander, BG William P. Yarborough) informed Yarborough that the President was keen on the Special Forces — but would not visit the SF base unless they were wearing their green berets. The Army, having previously forbidden the green beret, allowed the soldiers to wear them, lest JFK not visit. The Special Forces displayed their capabilities, impressing the President; so often, in the next years, that they referred to it as "Disneyland." President Kennedy's visit was topped with a Bell Aircraft pilot (dressed in Army fatigues) flying with a rocket belt to the President, and saluting him.

Kennedy approved of the Green Beret, and the U.S. Army authorised it. In 1962, he called the green beret, "a symbol of excellence, a badge of courage, a mark of distinction in the fight for freedom." Special Forces soldiers in berets and dress Greens were President Kennedy's cortege in 1963. An SF beret was photographed atop his grave at Arlington National Cemetery.

Earliest media
The first Special Forces Group on Okinawa provided a number of troopers to act as extras in director Samuel Fuller's Merrill's Marauders (1961) and were credited at film's start. On U.S. television, a March 1962 episode of Surfside 6 titled "The Green Beret" featured SF training. Henry Fonda appeared in, and narrated, a 1962 "Special Forces" episode of The Big Picture series of U.S. Army-produced films that found their way to U.S. television. In 1963, a Green Beret appeared in the episode "In Praise of Pip" of The Twilight Zone though the U.S. Army told the CBS television network to not name the Southeast Asian country where the story occurred. The Green Beret's first Hollywood appearance is in the futuristic thriller film Seven Days in May (1963) wherein Andrew Duggan is a Special Forces officer loyal to the U.S. president, not the traitorous JCS Chief Burt Lancaster; the film also gave the U.S. filmgoer a first glimpse of the M16 rifle.

Mattel toys made "Guerrilla Fighter" playsets in 1962 containing a commando green beret with an interesting tin "Guerrilla Fighter" badge depicting the crossed arrows insignia of the Special Forces, (formerly worn by the 1st Special Service Force, and before that the U.S. Army Indian Scouts) and a jungle knife in front of a parachute. The set also contained the Mattel Dick Tracy automatic cap firing "tommy gun" or "Scattergun" (the Dick Tracy cap firing but no longer water firing riot shotgun) toy guns, both now in military camouflage plastic, a military camouflaged poncho, and in some sets, a rubber Ka-Bar knife and a tripwire booby trap. Mattel later made the "M-16 Marauder", in 1966, which appeared in The Green Berets film wherein an enraged John Wayne smashes one against a tree.

The public was fascinated with this new type of soldier of the New Frontier, and the Army reluctantly gave journalists' access to many of Special Forces often top secret missions. One writer was Robin Moore, who used his connections with Harvard University classmate Robert F. Kennedy to write a book about the Special Forces. The U.S. Army agreed on the condition that Moore (then 38 years old) complete the Basic Airborne Course and SF training before being allowed to visit the Special Forces in South Vietnam.

Saturation

Robin Moore successfully completed the courses and was allowed to live with the soldiers in Special Forces and their South Vietnamese, Montagnard, and Nung allies. His book, The Green Berets, was published in 1965, but, because he mentions the American presence in North Vietnam and Cambodia, he published The Green Berets as a novel. The U.S. Army was upset by the book; the reading public was not and it became a best selling book, especially its paperback edition in 1966.

At the time of Moore's book and the increasing U.S. Military involvement in the Vietnam War, Special Forces Staff Sergeant Barry Sadler wrote a song with Robin Moore and recorded it under the title the "Ballad of the Green Berets," which became the number-one single of 1966 in the U.S. In addition to the single, Sadler released an album Ballads of the Green Berets with Sadler's photograph of him in a green beret appearing on the single, the LP, and on the paperback cover of Moore's The Green Berets. SSgt. Sadler later recorded an additional, but lesser, song "The A-Team" and released two more long-playing albums, then wrote his autobiography, I'm A Lucky One.

"Ballad of the Green Berets" had many cover versions ranging from Ennio Morricone and Duane Eddy to "drugstore records" on labels such as Diplomat and Wyncote records. Hanna-Barbera Records released a children's LP The Story of the Green Beret available to members of the G.I. Joe club. The album was a tie-in with the release of the G.I. Joe Green Beret action figure that had appeared in 1966. The record had an album cover of Special Forces in action and a picture of the Medal of Honor. The record started off with a cover version of "Ballad of the Green Berets" but was a spoken account with sound effects of Colonel Pat Lawrence (Mike Road) taking two small boys (Andy and George) to visit Fort Bragg, North Carolina, to learn about the training and capabilities of The Green Berets. The album then featured an exciting account of the Battle of Nam Dong where Captain Roger Donlon received the first Medal of Honor in the Vietnam War.

A less successful song was Nancy Ames' "He Wore The Green Beret" with a flip side of "War is a Card Game". Dickie Goodman pitted the two fads of 1966 against each other in Batman & His Grandmother where the Caped Crusader went up against the Green Beret.

Robin Moore also wrote a 1965 Tales of the Green Beret newspaper comic strip with artwork by Sgt. Rock (comics) Joe Kubert that was also published in paperback. It later became a Dell Publishing American comic book in 1967 replacing their earlier Jungle War Stories and Guerrilla War comics. When DC Comics's Larry Rock (brother of the Sergeant), the replacement in Our Fighting Forces for the Marines Gunner and Sarge and their dog Pooch proved unpopular, DC replaced him with a Green Beret named Captain Hunter in 1966. Captain Hunter's adventures featured him hunting for his twin brother, a pilot shot down and captured by the Viet Cong. Other war comics put in their own Green Beret characters, such as Lightning Comics' Todd Holton-Super Green Beret (1967).

Children could also enjoy Philadelphia Gum "Men of the Green Beret" trading cards of photographs of the Special Forces in action with a stick of bubble gum. The artwork on the box was by artist Norm Saunders of Mars Attacks fame. Aurora Models came out with a model of a Green Beret soldier.

Feature films
With all the interest in the men of the Green Berets, a film version seemed a long time in coming. Columbia Pictures had bought the film rights to Robin Moore's book before publication, using the title, The Green Berets, for a screenplay about the training of an SF Team and their deployment in Southeast Asia, but dropped the idea, because of the U.S. Army's many conditions and the U.S. public's dissatisfaction with the Vietnam War. Producer David L. Wolper then bought the rights to The Green Berets, and dropped the idea for reasons like Columbia Pictures. A screenplay was written by George Goodman who had served with the Special Forces in the 1950s as a military intelligence officer and had written a 1961 article about the Special Forces called The Unconventional Warriors in Esquire Magazine. Columbia sent Goodman to South Vietnam to research the screenplay. Wolper later produced The Devil's Brigade (1968) with Utah-based National Guard SF soldiers as extras, wearing attractive, but imaginary red berets.

Thus, it fell to John Wayne to buy the rights and ask President Lyndon Johnson's help in obtaining the assistance and cooperation of the Pentagon in filming the book. The Army set strict conditions, forbidding Moore to work on or be associated with the film, though the film trailer has the caption "TOLD TOUGH - LIKE THE BOOK". Despite Wayne's box office prestige and public interest in The Green Berets, the film was rejected by Universal Pictures and Paramount Pictures. Wayne's preferred film composer, Elmer Bernstein, refused to write the score. Wayne used his Batjac Productions money to make the film, which Warner Bros. profitably released to some public protest.

John Wayne's version of Robin Moore's The Green Berets begins with a choral version of the "Ballad of the Green Berets" heard behind Wayne Fitzgerald's titles that segue to an SF A-Team putting on a "Disneyland" show for journalists, including skeptical David Janssen. From SF Colonel John Wayne, reporter Janssen wangles a trip to the Vietnam War, and, eventually, participates in a large-scale battle, based on the Battle of Nam Dong. In the end, Janssen tells Wayne "If I write what I feel, I'll be out of a job". Wayne tells Janssen he'll always have one with them.

The last third of the film is Green Beret expertise in a commando mission to abduct a North Vietnamese General who has been seduced by the sister-in-law of an ARVN Special Forces Colonel (played by Jack Soo). The climax is a superb demonstration of combatives by former-Tarzan Mike Henry killing a horde of Viet Cong who attack him, even impaling one on a low tree branch. The martial arts inspired many film producers.

Tom Laughlin made a highly profitable American International Pictures film called The Born Losers (1967) featuring Billy Jack, a half-American Indian former Green Beret Vietnam War veteran using his martial arts on a motorcycle gang. The 1971 American International Pictures film Chrome and Hot Leather features SF men Tony Young, Peter Brown, and Marvin Gaye using their training and Vietnam War experience to avenge the murder of Young's girlfriend by William Smith's motorcycle gang. The film's poster shows a uniformed Green Beret using a biker as a sub-human punching bag with the tagline: "DON'T MUCK AROUND WITH A GREEN BERET'S MAMA!  HE'LL TAKE HIS CHOPPER AND RAM IT DOWN YOUR THROAT!"

Decline

Disenchantment
As the public wearied of the Green Berets, so did the American Regular Army. The 1969 "Green Beret Murder Case" in which Colonel Robert B. Rheault and several of his men were tried for assassinating a Communist spy was used as a discrediting tactic against the Special Forces. The case also contributed to the plot of the movie Apocalypse Now in which a Green Beret Colonel accused of the same offence has gone rogue.

Rambo
In 1972, author David Morrell published First Blood, a novel that features a former member of the Army Special Forces named John Rambo. The novel focuses on the struggle Rambo faces when he attempts to return to civilian life following the end of his tour of duty in Vietnam, and he eventually turns to violence. In 1982, a film adaptation of the novel was released, starring Sylvester Stallone. The film altered many aspects of the novel, including excising the self-loathing characteristics the protagonist possesses in the novel. The film was a box office success, and spawned a media franchise.

Ongoing references

Movies
In the 1968 film, The Green Berets, John Wayne portrays Mike Kirby, a Colonel with the 5th Special Forces Group during the Vietnam War.
In the film Billy Jack (1971), the main protagonist Tom Laughlin is a "half-breed" American Navajo,[3] a Green Beret Vietnam War veteran, and a hapkido master.
 In the film First Blood (1982), Sylvester Stallone portrays John Rambo, a former Green Beret searching for his old friend from his time in the Special Forces. The film is based on the 1972 novel First Blood by David Morrell. The film altered many aspects of the novel, including excising the self-loathing characteristics the protagonist possesses in the novel. The film was a box office success, and spawned a media franchise.
In the film Commando (1985), the main protagonist John Matrix, portrayed by Arnold Schwarzenegger, and many of the antagonists are former Special Forces soldiers. One of the more memorable lines in the movie was, "I eat green berets for breakfast, and right now, I'm very hungry!"
In the film Collateral, the main antagonist Vincent was a US Army Green Beret before becoming a hitman.
The film Executive Decision (1996) features a Special Forces CT team.
In the film Dear John (2010), the main character is a Special Forces soldier who reenlists after the terrorist attacks of September 11, 2001.
Jason Bourne of "The Bourne Identity" fame was a Special Forces Captain in the film series.
The film Predator (1987) follows a team of former Special Forces soldiers who are now a US Army rescue team sent to Val Verde to rescue an American politician but are hunted by The Predator.
In the film Lethal Weapon (1987), one of the two main protagonists was Mel Gibson's character Martin Riggs who before joining the LAPD was a US Army Special Forces sniper at the age of 19 in the Vietnam War.
In the film The Objective, the soldiers are an ODA from 3rd SFG.
In the movie Three Kings, George Clooney plays a Green Beret Major and Delta Operator, Archie Gates.
In the movie Walking Tall, Dwayne Johnson plays a Special Forces soldier from 5th SFG.
The film 12 Strong  tells the story of ODA 595, one of the first Special Forces teams deployed to Afghanistan after 9/11.
 In the 2010 film The A-Team, A reboot of the TV series of same name, the team members are depicted as Rangers instead, though the Special Forces Tab can be seen on their Army Service Uniforms.
In the 2015 zombie comedy film Range 15, U.S. military veterans portray fictionalized versions of themselves, with a couple of them being former Special Forces. Fictional characters SGM Gene Vandenham and Colonel Holloway are also depicted as Special Forces as they can be seen wearing the Long Tab.
In the film and TV franchise The Karate Kid / Cobra Kai, the antagonist karate master John Kreese is played by Martin Kove, who is shown to be an ex-Green Beret during Vietnam and the US Army karate champion.
In the 2016 film Dirty Grandpa, it is revealed that Richard Kelly, played by Robert De Niro, is ex-Green Beret.

Television
In the TV series Person of Interest (2011), one of the two main protagonists is John Reese, a former Green Beret and CIA field officer, who now lives the life of the "tall guy in a suit". 
In The A-Team (1983–87), the heroes are rogue Special Forces team (from the 5th Special Forces Group) turned crime fighters for hire. 
In the TV series Dynasty, one of the main characters, Dex Dexter (Michael Nader), who appeared on the series from 1983 until its cancellation in 1989, is an ex-special forces operative who is something of an adventurer and often goes on daring missions.  On several occasions, he mentions his service in the Vietnam War.
In the TV series 24, Jack Bauer, the series' main protagonist, was a member of US Special Forces before working at CTU Los Angeles. Bauer's participation in a previous Special Forces mission is a significant element of the first season's plot. 
The Unit is a TV series depicting the life of Special Forces soldiers and the Delta Force, based loosely on a book by Eric Haney.
In the TV series The Simpsons (1989–present), recurring character Principal Skinner has stated that he's an ex-Green Beret.
Deadliest Warrior season 1 episode "Green Beret vs Spetsnaz", pitted the U.S. Special Forces went against the Russian Spetsnaz. After running 1000 simulated battles, the Spetsnaz emerged victorious with 519 wins by a very narrow margin.
Burn Notice's Michael Westen is a former Green Beret and Delta Force Operator.
In the crime drama The Mentalist, Special Agent Kimball Cho is a former member of the Army Special Forces.
Knightrider is a TV series about a crime fighter using a technologically advanced car whose main protagonist, Michael Knight, was a former Green Beret. 
Law & Order: Special Victims Unit the squad's former commander Captain Cragen was an ex-Green Beret.
Cover Up a TV series about a former Green Beret who now serves as a spy posing as a fashion model.
Taken, a TV series that fills in the background for the Bryan Mills character from the Taken film franchise, the character is revealed to be a former Green Beret.
Special Forces: Untold Stories, a docudrama television series produced by New Dominion Pictures features an episode about the Green Berets during the Vietnam War.

Literature
 1965: Outpost of Freedom, by Medal of Honor recipient Captain Roger H. C. Donlon (as told to Warren Rogers) 1965, McGraw-Hill
 1975: Parthian Shot, by former Green Beret Loyd Little. , ; winner of the 1976 Hemingway Foundation/PEN Award.
 2008: White Passage: Red Sun, by former Green Beret Matt Rowe.  , 2008, Authorhouse.
 2009: Horse Soldiers: The Extraordinary Story of a Band of U.S. Soldiers Who Rode to Victory in Afghanistan, by Doug Stanton; adapted into the 2018 film, 12 Strong.
In Tom Clancy's Ghost Recon, the operators are elite Green Beret soldiers.
Several books of W. E. B. Griffin's Brotherhood of War series deal, in a fictional setting, with the establishment and early operations of the Green Berets. Several events in the series track with actual history.
Shaun Darragh's novel MIKE FORCE: A Novel of Vietnam's Central Highlands War, set in the fifth Special Forces Group's II Corps MIKE Force of 1967–1968, portrays a small team of U.S., Australian, and Vietnamese Special Forces leading a Montagnard paratroop company loyal to a rebel movement that is planning a revolt. Darragh served in Vietnam on both an A Team and in the MIKE Force.
 The main character of The Lyssa Kordenay Missions series, written by Alecia Snowfall, Lyssa Kordenay; is a post-operative transgender woman formerly of Fifth Group Special Forces later of First Group Special Forces: Special Operational Detachment- Delta (now known as C.A.G.- Combat Applications Group) before being selected for the fictional unit DemonWraiths then being medically discharged after being captured by narco-terrorists on a hostage rescue mission. Steel Butterfly begins the series. Later on in the series another closeted transgender serving on active duty is recruited, Tiffany Davareaux, leading to one of three spin-offs under the title The Chrysalis Project.

Video games
In the Metal Gear Solid video game series, the protagonists Solid Snake and Big Boss are former Green Berets.
Mortal Kombat video game series characters Sonya Blade and Jax Briggs are members of the Special Forces, as are their respective daughters, Cassie Cage and Jacqui Briggs.
In the video game Left 4 Dead,  Bill is a veteran that served in the 1st Special Forces Group.
 Lincoln Clay, the protagonist in Mafia III, served with the 5th Special Forces Group during the Vietnam War.

Comics
The father of the Modern Age Batwoman, Colonel Jacob Kane, is a Green Beret, specifically from the 3rd Special Forces Group.  After Kate Kane is discharged from West Point under Don't Ask Don't Tell, a chance encounter with Batman inspires her to take up the role of a masked vigilante in Gotham City. Jacob Kane uses his connections within the special operations community to have his daughter trained around the globe, after which she takes up the Batwoman mantle. Notably, prior to becoming a vigilante, Kate gets a tattoo of the Green Beret sleeve insignia on her shoulder in memory of her mother Gabrielle, who had a similar tattoo.

References

United States in popular culture
Army Special Forces
Military units and formations in popular culture
 
Fictional Special Operations Forces of the United States